Martin Tsirkov (born 29 December 1988) is a Bulgarian retired footballer who played as a defender and now manager..

Playing career
He started his career at the young teams of Dunav Ruse. He was in the team during 2005-2006 season where he debuted in 2nd division (also known as "B" PFG) at the age of 16. He played there until 2006-2007, when the notable coach Ferario Spasov loaned him to neighbor team Benkovski (Byala). Tsirkov played there until 2008. After that he came back to the team of his heart - Dunav. He played some memorable matches in the 2009/2010 season, where the team was near promotion to the "A" Professional football group. After Dunav was dissolved in 2010, he moved to Sliven, where he played 13 matches in the 1st division. He subsequently moved to Spartak(Varna), where he played about 25 games in "B" PFG and in January 2013 he came back to Dunav(Ruse) where he will help the team to promote again to 2nd division. He is known as a big fan of Dunav and the fans really like him and his hard style of playing.

Managerial career
Tsirkov become manager of Dunav Ruse in December 2020. Under his management, the team returned in Second League. He was released from the club on 2 September 2022.

References

External links 
 Profile 
 

1988 births
Living people
Bulgarian footballers
FC Dunav Ruse players
OFC Sliven 2000 players
PFC Spartak Varna players
First Professional Football League (Bulgaria) players
Association football defenders
Sportspeople from Ruse, Bulgaria